The M44 was an American-made self-propelled 155 mm howitzer based on the M41 Walker Bulldog tank chassis, first introduced in the early 1950s.  Flaws in its design prevented it from seeing action in the Korean War, but the type went on to serve in the armies of the United States, West Germany, Italy, and the United Kingdom into the late Cold War period, and even longer in Turkish service.

History
Towards the end of the Korean War the US Army sought to replace the M41 Howitzer Motor Carriage with the M44, which used the drive train of the recently introduced M41 light tank, giving it increased battlefield mobility.  Unlike the M41 and the earlier M12 Gun Motor Carriage, the M44 was to have an enclosed gun compartment,  giving the five man crew some armor protection even when firing the cannon. The 155mm cannon was a version of the M114 designated the M45 Howitzer with a modified recoil system that was more compact and put all the cannon under armor except the top and the barrel, along with 24 rounds of ammunition.

The initial prototype was designated the T99E1, but production began before testing was complete.  After 250 had already been produced by the Massey Harris company, it was discovered that firing the howitzer discharged poisonous fumes into the gun compartment, leading to the cancellation of the order. Engineers offered a revised design called the T194E1 with a modified howitzer and open crew compartment that successfully vented the fumes, albeit at the cost of crew protection. The already produced vehicles were upgraded to the new standard, and deployed to front line units in 1954, too late to see action in the Korean War, with the designation M44. The M44 fleet was later upgraded with AOS-895-6 engines, and thus designated the M44A1. The M44 served on until 1963, when it was replaced by the M109.

The M44 was exported to West Germany, Italy, the UK (where it was called the "Cardinal" under the ecclesiastical naming convention for self-propelled artillery) and Turkey.

British M44s
In 1956, the United Kingdom received 58 M44s through the Mutual Defense Assistance Program. 52 were deployed to the British Army of the Rhine in the 1st Royal Horse Artillery and 4th Royal Horse Artillery, while the remaining six were sent to England. The M44 was considered a major improvement over the World War II vintage Sexton self-propelled howitzers. As newer weapons became available, the M44s were passed on to different units, and were ultimately retired and returned to the United States in June 1968.

Turkish M44T
In 1986, 222 Turkish Army M44s were extensively upgraded with 36 caliber 155mm howitzers by Rheinmetall with an increased range of 24.7 km. An  MTU MB 833 Aa-501 V-6 water-cooled diesel developing 450 hp at 2,300 rpm coupled to the original Allison CD-500-3 transmission via a ZF gearbox was fitted. There were numerous other improvements such as upgraded suspension, tracks and fire control and increased fuel capacity. The driver's position was moved into the hull. The last was delivered in 1992. Some sources claim they have now been withdrawn, but two were seen in a video by the Russian news agency RT, allegedly firing into Northern Syria from a border post inside Turkey in 2015.

Variants
 T99E1: Closed-topped prototype pilot vehicle
 T194E1 and M44:  Revised open-topped production model
 M44A1: M44s upgraded with AOS-895-6 engine, increasing range to 82 miles
 M44T: 222 Turkish vehicles upgraded with 36 caliber 155 mm howitzers with range of 24.7 km, new engines with greatly increased range, reconfigured driver's seat, fire control and other upgrades.  Upgrades conducted between 1986 and 1992.

Operators
  : 250 produced
  : 58 received in 1955, serving until 1968
  : All retired
 : In service from 1956 to 1967. 25 in stock in 1983
  : All retired
  : Served in the heavy battalion of Italian Armored divisions, including the Ariete division until 1970.
  : 222 upgraded to M44T variant by Rheinmetall between 1986 and 1992.
  : 10 served from 1965 to 1980s, replaced by the Type 75

Surviving vehicles
At least 39 surviving M44s have been identified in North America and Europe, not including any still in Turkish service.

References

External links 
 M44 Self Propelled Howitzers in Action    1950s documentary
 Surviving M44 Self-Propelled Howitzers

155 mm artillery
Self-propelled howitzers of the United States
Tracked self-propelled howitzers
Military vehicles introduced in the 1950s